Sonny & Cher Live is the first live album by American pop duo Sonny & Cher, released in 1971 by Kapp/MCA Records. The album reached #35 on the Billboard chart and was certified Gold for the sales of 500,000 copies.

Album information
In 1971 the couple returned to the charts with the album "Sonny & Cher Live", on the label Kapp Records in the US  and MCA Records in the UK. The album is largely a collection of cover songs including "More Today Than Yesterday" (originally by The Spiral Starecase) and "Danny Boy". This album also contained three songs by The Beatles:  "Got To Get You Into My Life", "Hey Jude", and "Something".

One single was issued from this album, that being "I Got You Babe", backed with an edited version of "Danny Boy". The song "Laugh at Me" was performed by Bono as solo while "Danny Boy" and "Once in a Lifetime" (after which Sonny can be heard saying approvingly "Not bad, not bad") were performed only by Cher. A portion of this album was re-released on the Cher and Sonny & Cher Kapp/MCA Anthology All I Ever Need, and on the 1990 compilation album All I Ever Need Is You.

Track listing
Side A
"What Now My Love" (Carl Sigman, Gilbert Bécaud, Pierre Delanoë) - 2:52
"The Beat Goes On" (Sonny Bono) - 9:00
"Once in a Lifetime" (from "Stop the World – I Want to Get Off")(Anthony Newley, Leslie Bricusse) - 2:08
"More Today Than Yesterday" (Pat Upton) - 2:32
"Got to Get You into My Life" (Lennon–McCartney) - 1:25
"Someday (You'll Want Me To Want You)" (Jimmie Hodges) - 4:00

Side B
"Danny Boy" (Frederick Weatherly) - 5:53
"Laugh at Me" (Sonny Bono) - 2:46
"Something" (George Harrison) - 4:00
"Hey Jude" (Lennon–McCartney) - 7:30
"I Got You Babe" (Sonny Bono) - 3:26

Note the running time of the album (55:30) exceeds the length listed for the individual tracks (45:31), due to banter between the songs.

Charts and certifications

Weekly charts

Certifications and sales

Personnel
Cher - vocals
Sonny Bono - vocals
Mike Rubini - piano
Al Pellegrini - orchestra conductor
Dean Parks (credited as Dean Parker) - guitar
Matt Betton - drums
Bert Fanette - organ
David Hungate - bass guitar
Dahrell Norris - percussion

Production
Denis Pregnolato - producer
Angel Balestier - engineer
Nye Morton - assistant engineer

References

Sonny & Cher albums
1971 live albums
MCA Records live albums
Kapp Records live albums